George Ragsdale (born April 4, 1951) is a former American football coach and former player. He is the interim head football coach at Central State University in Wilberforce, Ohio. Ragsdale is played college football at North Carolina A&T State University. and professionally with the Tampa Bay Buccaneers of the National Football League, and played in the United States Football League (USFL). He was used primarily as a kick returner. Ragsdale served as the interim head football coach at North Carolina A&T for the final four games of the 2008 season and at Grambling State University for four games in the middle of the 2013 season.

After his pro football playing days were over, Ragsdale has served at various coaching duties at his alma mater as well as Morris Brown College, Norfolk State University, University of Arkansas at Pine Bluff. On September 11, 2013, he was named interim head football coach at Grambling State University. On October 17, 2013, Ragsdale was fired as interim head coach at Grambling.

Head coaching record

Notes

References

External links
 Central State (OH) profile
 North Carolina A&T profile
 

1951 births
Living people
American football running backs
Arkansas–Pine Bluff Golden Lions football coaches
Central State Marauders football coaches
Grambling State Tigers football coaches
Morris Brown Wolverines football coaches
Norfolk State Spartans football coaches
North Carolina A&T Aggies football coaches
North Carolina A&T Aggies football players
North Carolina A&T State University alumni
Oklahoma Outlaws players
Tampa Bay Bandits players
Tampa Bay Buccaneers players
High school football coaches in North Carolina
People from Dinwiddie County, Virginia
Coaches of American football from Maryland
Players of American football from Baltimore
African-American coaches of American football
African-American players of American football
20th-century African-American sportspeople
21st-century African-American sportspeople